Georges Tourry (14 May 1904 – 16 July 1991) was a French architect. His work was part of the architecture event in the art competition at the 1948 Summer Olympics.

References

External links
 

1904 births
1991 deaths
20th-century French architects
Olympic competitors in art competitions
Architects from Paris